Hallie is a town in Chippewa County in the U.S. state of Wisconsin. As of the 2010 census its population was 161. In 2000, the town population was 4,703 according to the federal census.

History
The  squares that became the Town of Halley were first surveyed in the fall of 1848 by crews working for the U.S. government. In August and September 1849 another crew marked all the section corners, walking the woods and swamps on foot, measuring with chain and compass. When done, the deputy surveyor filed this general description of the six mile square which includes eastern Halley and the early town of Chippewa Falls:
   The Surface of this Township is rolling. The Soil is uniformly Sandy, 2nd & 3rd rate. In the South East part of the Township is a well-timbered tract of land The most valuable kinds of timber are White &  Bur(?) Oak Black Ash Lind White Pine and Sugar. There is a Sugar Camp on the S.E. 1/4 of Section 21 and the N.E. 1/4 of Section 29.
   The Falls of Chippewa River in This Township are a Succession of rapids over which the Lumbermen raft in safety Lumber Hewed timber and shingles  The River falls about 25 feet in 3/4 of a mile, Making a excellent water power which is improved by James Allen and Company. They now have four Saws in successful operation and a Lath Mill nearly completed.
   There is one Store, one Tavern, and one Blacksmith Shop and several dwelling houses at the Falls all situated on the West half of the S.W. 1/4 of Section 5 and the East half of the S.E. 1/4 of Section 6. There are four dwelling Houses on the North half of Section 7.
   The Pond in Sections 14 and 15 is much resorted to in the summer(?) Season for the purpose of hunting deer by torch light.

Geography
The town of Hallie is located along the southern edge of Chippewa County and is bordered to the south by Eau Claire County. It is bordered to the north and west by the village of Lake Hallie, formerly part of the town.

Demographics
	

As of the census of 2000, there were 4,703 people, 1,690 households, and 1,308 families residing in the town.  The population density was 219.7 people per square mile (84.9/km2).  There were 1,729 housing units at an average density of 80.8 per square mile (31.2/km2).  The racial makeup of the town was 97.15% White, 0.17% African American, 0.19% Native American, 1.45% Asian, 0.40% from other races, and 0.64% from two or more races. Hispanic or Latino of any race were 0.89% of the population.

There were 1,690 households, out of which 39.7% had children under the age of 18 living with them, 66.9% were married couples living together, 6.6% had a female householder with no husband present, and 22.6% were non-families. 15.9% of all households were made up of individuals, and 4.9% had someone living alone who was 65 years of age or older.  The average household size was 2.78 and the average family size was 3.12.

In the town, the population was spread out, with 28.2% under the age of 18, 8.3% from 18 to 24, 31.7% from 25 to 44, 22.9% from 45 to 64, and 9.0% who were 65 years of age or older.  The median age was 35 years. For every 100 females, there were 104.9 males.  For every 100 females age 18 and over, there were 107.1 males.

The median income for a household in the town was $46,547, and the median income for a family was $52,220. Males had a median income of $35,313 versus $24,449 for females. The per capita income for the town was $17,523.  About 3.6% of families and 6.5% of the population were below the poverty line, including 8.9% of those under age 18 and 6.9% of those age 65 or over.

References

Towns in Chippewa County, Wisconsin
Eau Claire–Chippewa Falls metropolitan area
Towns in Wisconsin